Tribe of Noise BV is a social networking service catered to musicians.

History 
Tribe of Noise was founded by Sandra Brandenburg and Hessel van Oorscho] in 2008 with an objective was to create an open community where independent musicians could share their music legally with businesses and media professionals in return for exposure. It was one of 23 finalists in The Next Web PayPal X Startup Rally 2010.

Tribe of Noise has partnerships with companies including Getty Images,. On September 12, 2019 Tribe of Noise acquired Free Music Archive for an undisclosed amount.

References

External links
 

Dutch music websites
Dutch social networking websites